The 2002 World Wheelchair Curling Championship was held from January 21 to 26 in Sursee, Switzerland.

Teams

Round-robin standings

Round-robin results

Draw 1

Draw 2

Draw 3

Draw 4

Draw 5

Draw 6

Draw 7

Draw 8

Draw 9

Playoffs

Semifinals

Bronze medal game

Gold medal game

External links

2002 in curling
World Wheelchair Curling Championship
2002 in Swiss sport
International curling competitions hosted by Switzerland
International sports competitions hosted by Switzerland